Metropolitan Manila (often shortened as Metro Manila), officially the National Capital Region (NCR), is the seat of government and one of three defined metropolitan areas in the Philippines. It is composed of 16 highly urbanized cities: the city of Manila, Quezon City, Caloocan, Las Piñas, Makati, Malabon, Mandaluyong, Marikina, Muntinlupa, Navotas, Parañaque, Pasay, Pasig, San Juan, Taguig, and Valenzuela, as well as the municipality of Pateros. It is the second most populous and the most densely populated region of the Philippines. It is also the 9th most populous metropolitan area in Asia and the 5th most populous urban area in the world.

The region is the center of culture (including arts and entertainment), economy, education and government of the Philippines. Designated as a global power city, the region exerts a significant impact on commerce, finance, media, art, fashion, research, technology, education, and entertainment, both locally and internationally. It is the home to all embassies in the Philippines, thereby making it an important center for international diplomacy in the country. Its economic power makes the region the country's premier center for finance and commerce. The region accounts for 36% of the gross domestic product (GDP) of the Philippines.

The region was established in 1975 through Presidential Decree No. 824 in response to the needs to sustain the growing population and for the creation for the center of political power and the seat of the government of the Philippines. The Province of Manila, the predecessor entity of the region, is one of the first eight provinces that revolted against the Spanish colonial rule in the Philippines at the end of the 19th century. Manila's role in the Revolution is honored in the flag of the Philippines, where the sun's eight rays symbolize the eight revolutionary provinces.

History

Province of Manila

A historical province known as Manila encompassed territories once held by various pre-Hispanic polities. This included the well-known Pasig River delta settlements of Maynila and Tondo, but smaller settlements such as those at Tambobong, Taguig, Pateros, and the fortified polity of Cainta. It became the capital of the colonial Philippines, with Manila (Intramuros) serving as the center of colonial power. In 1898, it included the city of Manila and 23 other municipalities. Mariquina also served as the capital from 1898 to 1899, just as when the sovereignty of the Philippines was transferred to the United States. The province was dissolved and most of it was incorporated into the newly created province of Rizal on June 11, 1901, by Commonwealth Act 137.

Since the Spanish colonial period, Manila was considered one of the original global cities. The Manila galleon was the first known commercially traveled trade route that sailed the Pacific for 250 years, bringing to Mexico their cargoes of luxury goods, economic benefits, and cultural exchange.

Creation of the province of Rizal
During the American period, at the time of the Philippine Commonwealth, American architect and urban designer Daniel Burnham was commissioned to create the grand Plan of Manila to be approved by the Philippine Government. The creation of Manila in 1901 was composed of the places and parishes of Binondo, Ermita, Intramuros, Malate, Manila, Pandacan, Quiapo, Sampaloc, San Andrés Bukid, San Fernando de Dilao, San Miguel, San Nicolas, Santa Ana de Sapa, Santa Cruz, Santa Mesa and Tondo. Meanwhile, the towns and parishes of Caloocan, Las Piñas, Mariquina, Pasig, Parañaque, Malabon, Navotas, San Juan del Monte, San Pedro de Macati, San Felipe Neri, Muntinlupa and the Taguig-Pateros area were incorporated into the province of Rizal, with Pasig being designated as its provincial capital.

In 1939, President Quezon established Quezon City with a goal to replace Manila as the capital city of the country. A master plan for Quezon City was completed. The establishment of Quezon City meant the demise of the grand Burnham Plan of Manila, with funds being diverted for the establishment of the new capital. World War II further resulted in the loss of most of the developments in the Burnham Plan, but more importantly, the loss of more than 100,000 lives at the Battle of Manila in 1945. Later on, Quezon City was eventually declared as the national capital in 1948. The title was re-designated back to Manila in 1976 through Presidential Decree No. 940, owing to its historical significance as the almost uninterrupted seat of government of the Philippines since the Spanish colonial period. Presidential Decree No. 940 states that Manila has always been, to the Filipino people and in the eyes of the world, the premier city of the Philippines, being the center of trade, commerce, education, and culture.

Creation of the city of Greater Manila
During the war, President Manuel L. Quezon created the City of Greater Manila as an emergency measure, merging the cities of Manila and Quezon City, along with the municipalities of Caloocan, Las Piñas, Mariquina, Pasig, Parañaque, Malabon, Navotas, San Juan del Monte, San Pedro de Macati, San Felipe Neri, Muntinlupa and the Taguig-Pateros area. Jorge Vargas was appointed as its mayor. Mayors in the cities and municipalities included in the City of Greater Manila served as vice mayors in their town. This was in order to ensure that Vargas, who was Quezon's principal lieutenant for administrative matters, would have a position of authority recognized under international military law. The City of Greater Manila was abolished by the Japanese with the formation of the Philippine Executive Commission to govern the occupied regions of the country. The City of Greater Manila served as a model for the present-day Metro Manila and the administrative functions of the Governor of Metro Manila that was established during the Marcos administration.

Creation of the National Capital Region
On November 7, 1975, Metro Manila was formally established through Presidential Decree No. 824. The Metropolitan Manila Commission was also created to manage the region. On June 2, 1978, through Presidential Decree No. 1396, the metropolitan area was declared the National Capital Region of the Philippines. When Metro Manila was established, there were four cities, Manila, Quezon City, Caloocan, Pasay and the thirteen municipalities of Las Piñas, Makati, Malabon, Mandaluyong, Marikina, Muntinlupa, Navotas, Parañaque, Pasig, San Juan, Taguig, Valenzuela and Pateros. At present, all but one of these municipalities have become independent chartered cities; only Pateros still remains as a municipality.

President Ferdinand Marcos appointed his wife, First Lady Imelda Marcos, as the first governor of Metro Manila. She launched the City of Man campaign. The Cultural Center of the Philippines Complex, Metropolitan Folk Arts Theater, Philippine International Convention Center, Coconut Palace and healthcare facilities such as the Lung Center of the Philippines, Philippine Heart Center, and the Kidney Center of the Philippines are all constructed precisely for this purpose. President Marcos was overthrown in a non-violent revolution along EDSA, which lasted four days in late February 1986. The popular uprising, now known as the People Power Revolution, made international headlines as "the revolution that surprised the world".

In 1986, President Corazon Aquino issued Executive Order No. 392, reorganizing and changing the structure of the Metropolitan Manila Commission and renamed it to the Metropolitan Manila Authority. Mayors in the metropolis chose from among themselves the chair of the agency. Later on, it was again reorganized in 1995 through Republic Act 7924, creating the present-day Metropolitan Manila Development Authority. The chairperson of the agency will be appointed by the President and should not have a concurrent elected position such as mayor. Former Laguna province governor Joey Lina was the last to serve as the Officer-In-Charge governor of Metro Manila.

Throughout 1988, unemployment among the country's regions was highest in Metro Manila, with 20.1% of the region's workforce being jobless according to the Department of Labor and Employment (DOLE) and the National Statistics Office.

By late 2014, then-MMDA Chairman Francis Tolentino proposed that San Pedro, Laguna be included in Metro Manila as its 18th member city. Tolentino said that in the first meeting of the MMDA Council of mayors in January 2015, he will push for the inclusion of the city to the MMDA. Senator Aquilino "Koko" Pimentel III filed Senate Bill No. 3029, which seeks to create San Pedro as a separate legislative district to commence in the next national and local elections if the bill was passed into law.

Geography

Metro Manila is located in the southwestern portion of Luzon. The region lies along the flat alluvial lands extending from the mouth of the Pasig River in the west to the higher rugged lands of Marikina Valley in the east. The region is geographically divided into 4 zones: the Coastal Margin, Guadalupe Plateau, Marikina Valley, and the Laguna Lowlands.

The Coastal Margin or Lowland is a flat and low plain that faces Manila Bay. Located here is Manila, Navotas, parts of Malabon, and the western part and reclaimed areas of Pasay and Parañaque, where the ground elevation ranges from zero meters on Manila Bay to five meters at the west side of the cities of Mandaluyong and Makati. The Coastal Lowland possesses resources for offshore fisheries and fishpond development, and various reclamation projects in the area are meant for mixed-use urban development.

The Central or Guadalupe Plateau is the most adaptable to urban development activities not only because of its solid geographical foundations but also because of its existing infrastructure links with the rest of Luzon. It is mainly residential and includes the densely populated areas of Metro Manila such San Juan, Makati and Quezon cities, as well as most parts of Caloocan and Mandaluyong. The ground elevation ranges from 20 meters to 40 meters and gradually becomes lower towards its western side, while ground elevation ranges from 70 meters to over 100 meters towards the northwestern side of the plateau. The area becomes narrower along the Pasig River.

The Marikina Valley is a floodplain along the Marikina River and a delta along Laguna de Bay. Its elevation ranges from two meters on the Laguna de Bay side to 30 meters on its north side towards Montalban. It is surrounded by the Central Plateau and mountains of Rizal. It has fertile land suitable for crop cultivation while the Marikina River provides water for industrial uses and discharge.

The Laguna Lowlands is not only suitable for agriculture and aquaculture but also for industrial activity.

Natural hazards

Metro Manila is exposed to multiple natural hazards such as earthquakes, floods, and typhoons. It is surrounded by active faults including the Marikina Valley Fault System. Other distant faults such as the Philippine Faults, Lubang Faults, Manila Trench and Casiguran Faults, are a threat as well. Flooding is recurrent every year especially in low-lying areas of Valenzuela, Malabon, Caloocan, Navotas, Manila, Pasay, Parañaque, and Las Piñas, where flood are generally linked with the tidal movements in Manila Bay. Meanwhile, Marikina, Pasig, Taguig, and Pateros are areas inland that are also prone to flooding. These areas are located along the Marikina Valley where there is poor soil drainage and a shallow water table due to being in proximity to Laguna Bay's shores. Flood risks are generally lower in cities along the Guadalupe Plateau, including Quezon City, San Juan, Makati, Mandaluyong and Muntinlupa, where volcanic rocks rise up to 40 to 70 meters above sea level. Around five to seven typhoons hit Manila yearly. Manila was ranked as the second riskiest capital city after Tokyo to live in according to Swiss Re.

Climate
According to the Köppen climate classification, there are two climates in Metro Manila. Most of the region has a tropical wet and dry climate (Köppen climate classification Aw) while the northeastern part of the region that lies on the foothills of Sierra Madre has a tropical monsoon climate. Together with the rest of the Philippines, Manila lies entirely within the tropics. Its proximity to the equator means that temperatures are hot year-round, rarely going below 15 °C or above 39 °C. Temperature extremes have ranged from 14.4 °C on January 11, 1914, to 38.5 °C on May 7, 1915.

Humidity levels are usually very high all year round. Manila has a distinct dry season from December through April, and a relatively lengthy wet season that covers the remaining period with slightly cooler temperatures. In the wet season, it rarely rains all day, but rainfall is very heavy during short periods. Typhoons usually occur from June to September.

Cityscapes

Parks

There are four national parks in Metro Manila. These are the Rizal Park, Paco Park, and Fort Santiago in the City of Manila and Quezon Memorial National Park in Quezon City. Rizal Park and Paco Park are managed by the National Parks and Development Committee (NPDC), while Fort Santiago is managed by the Intramuros Administration. A tripartite agreement between the Quezon City Government, the National Historical Institute and the NPDC transferred the management of Quezon Memorial National Park to the Quezon City Government. The region also has three protected areas, namely the Rizal Park, Ninoy Aquino Parks & Wildlife Center and the Manila Bay Beach Resort.

The park along with the historic walled area of Intramuros are designated as flagship destination to become a tourism enterprise zone according to the Tourism Act of 2009. Paco Park is a recreational garden which was once the city's municipal cemetery built by the Dominicans during the Spanish colonial period. Filipino Landscape architect IP Santos, the "Father of Philippine Landscape Architecture", was commissioned to do the design of converting the former cemetery into a park.

Manila Zoo is the oldest zoo in Asia, which was founded in 1959. It is the home to more than a thousand animals from 90 different species including the 40-year-old elephant, Mali. The zoo has an average of 4,000 visitors weekly. An estimated 40,000 tourists visit the zoo each month.

La Mesa Ecopark is a 33-hectare well-developed sanctuary around the La Mesa Watershed. It was established through a joint partnership between the Metropolitan Waterworks and Sewerage System, ABS-CBN, and the Quezon City Government. La Mesa Ecopark, along with the Ninoy Aquino Parks & Wildlife Center, are important nature reserves in the Philippines.

The Las Piñas-Parañaque Critical Habitat and Ecotourism Area (LPPCHEA) was declared as a critical habitat by the Government of the Philippines in 2007 and was listed by the Ramsar Convention as a Wetland of International Importance in 2013. LPPCHEA is composed of the Freedom Island in Parañaque and the Long Island in Las Piñas that covers 175 hectares and features a mangrove forest of eight species, tidal mudflats, secluded ponds with fringing salt-tolerant vegetation, a coastal lagoon, and a beach.

Government and politics

The framework of government and governance in Metro Manila is based on Republic Act No. 7160, otherwise known as the "Local Government Code of 1991". This law outlines the powers and responsibilities of all local government units (LGUS) in the Philippines and thus forms the basis of inter-local governmental relations among the area's constituent local governments. The local government code grants these units significant political and administrative autonomy in accordance with the principles of decentralization and devolution of power. This situation presents a challenge to the coordination of policy and service delivery across the multiple autonomous local government units and is thus the underlying dilemma of metropolitan governance in Metro Manila.

The Metropolitan Manila Development Authority (MMDA) is the agency responsible for the delivery of public services in Metro Manila. Its services are limited to traffic management and garbage collection. Previously Metro Manila was governed by a regional government authority, the Metro Manila Commission and was led by a governor.

A bill was introduced in 2014 proposing the creation of a new governing body in Metro Manila to be known as the Metropolitan Manila Regional Administration (MMRA). Unlike the MMDA which is limited to being an administrative coordinating body, the proposed MMRA will have police and other typical municipal powers and is more akin to the Bangsamoro Autonomous Region in Muslim Mindanao.

Metro Manila, the National Capital Region, is the seat of the national government. All the main offices of the executive departments of the country are in Metro Manila. The Department of Agrarian Reform, Department of Agriculture, Department of Environment and Natural Resources, National Housing Authority and Philippine Coconut Authority has their main offices based around Quezon Memorial Circle in Quezon City.

Manila, the capital city of the country, is the home to Malacañan Palace, the official residence and office of the President of the Philippines. The city is also the home to the Supreme Court of the Philippines. Other key national institutions based in Manila are the Court of Appeals, the Bangko Sentral ng Pilipinas, and the Departments of Budget and Management, Finance, Health, Justice, Labor and Employment and Public Works and Highways. Meanwhile, the Department of Science and Technology is based in Taguig while the Department of Tourism has its headquarters in Makati. Important economic and financial institutions headquartered in the region are the Asian Development Bank, Bangko Sentral ng Pilipinas, Development Bank of the Philippines, Land Bank of the Philippines and the National Economic and Development Authority.

The main office of the Government Service Insurance System in Pasay serves as home to the Senate of the Philippines. Meanwhile, the House of Representatives of the Philippines is based in the Batasang Pambansa Complex, Quezon City along with the Sandiganbayan. The Coconut Palace once served as the official office and residence of the Vice President of the Philippines in 2010–2016. The Quezon City Reception House has been serving this purpose since 2016.

Administrative divisions
The political and administrative boundaries of the National Capital Region has not changed since its formation in 1975 as a public corporation under Presidential Decree No. 824. They are composed of sixteen independent cities, classified as highly urbanized cities, and one independent municipality: Pateros.

Districts
Unlike other administrative regions in the Philippines, Metro Manila is not composed of provinces. Instead, the region is divided into four geographic areas called "districts." The districts have their district centers at the four original cities in the region: the city-district of Manila (Capital District), Quezon City (Eastern Manila), Caloocan (Northern Manila, also informally known as Camanava), and Pasay (Southern Manila). The districts serve mainly to organize the region's local government units for fiscal and statistical purposes.

Future expansion
There is a high demand for the inclusion of San Pedro, Laguna in Metro Manila. Support groups from the local government and non-government organizations are striving to incorporate San Pedro into Metro Manila.

San Pedro is being looked at as the 18th member of Metro Manila. Former Metro Manila Development Authority (MMDA) Chairman Francis Tolentino is pushing for the inclusion of San Pedro in the National Capital Region, to eventually become its 18th member city. Tolentino said that in the first meeting of the MMDA Council of mayors in January 2015, he will push for the inclusion of the city to the MMDA.

Demographics

Metro Manila has a population of  according to the 2020 national census. It is the second most populous (after Calabarzon) and most densely populated region in the Philippines, the 7th most populous metropolitan area in Asia, and the 4th most populous urban area in the world.

The most populous cities in Metro Manila are Quezon City (2,960,048), Manila (1,846,513), Caloocan (1,661,584), Taguig (886,722), Pasig (803,159), Valenzuela (714,978), Parañaque (689,992) Las Piñas (606,293), Makati (629,616) and Muntinlupa (543,445).

Poverty, housing and urban slums

From the 1980s up to the present, informal settlers have accounted for roughly one-third of the Metro Manila population. A majority of informal settlers belong to the middle-class. In 2014, there are an estimated four million slum dwellers living in Metro Manila. Homelessness is also a major problem in Metro Manila. However, these are being addressed by creating in-city relocation housing, and by relocating informal settler families in low-density housing built in the nearby provinces of Batangas, Bulacan, Cavite, Laguna and Rizal.

During the American occupation, housing policies in Manila dealt the problem of sanitation and concentration of settlers around business areas. Among those implemented were business codes and sanitation laws in slum areas in the 1930s. During this period and until the 1950s, new communities were opened for relocation. Among these were Projects 1–8 in Diliman, Quezon City and the Vitas tenement houses in Tondo. The government implemented the Public Housing Policy in 1947 that established the People's Homesite and Housing Corporation (PHHC). A few years later, it put up the Slum Clearance Committee which, with the help of the PHHC, relocated thousands of families from Tondo and Quezon City to Sapang Palay in San Jose del Monte, Bulacan in the 1960s.

During the time of President Ferdinand Marcos, the World Bank and the Asian Development Bank supported the programs for the "development of relocation" and "on-site development." Carmona and Dasmariñas in Cavite and San Pedro in Laguna opened as relocation sites. Along with the establishment of the National Housing Authority (Philippines), Presidential Decree 772 made squatting a crime, making the Philippines one of only two countries (the other is South Africa) where squatting is a crime. The government formulated the National Shelter Program which became the over-all framework for dealing with housing needs of all income classes.

Imelda Marcos held both the position as Governor of Metro Manila and as Minister of Human Settlements and Ecology or MHSE until the downfall of the dictatorship in 1986. The MHSE, through loans from the World Bank, initiated the Bagong Lipunan Improvement of Sites and Services (BLISS) housing projects not only in Metro Manila but also in other provinces.

From 1960 to 1992, the government transferred some 328,000 families to resettlement sites 25–40 km from Metro Manila. According to the Asian Coalition on Housing Rights, during Corazon C. Aquino's time, the government would bring some 100,000 persons to relocation sites yearly. During the said period, Sapang Palay and Carmona had a 60% abandonment rate. Congress enacted RA 7279 or the Urban Development and Housing Act (UDHA) in 1992. The law gave a new name for the squatters: informal settlers. Essentially, UDHA gives protection for big private ownership of land in the urban areas, ensuring that these are protected from illegal occupants. The law also widened the scope of private sector participation in the National Shelter Program (NSP).

In the middle of the Arroyo administration's term, infrastructure projects of the government led to the demolition of hundreds of thousands of families (from along railways, C4 road, C5 road, and from Fort Bonifacio). During the same period, new relocation sites in Bulacan, Valenzuela and Caloocan opened.

Economy
The National Capital Region accounts for 36% of the gross domestic product of the Philippines in 2018. Furthermore, it has the highest per capita GDP of the country at ₱183,747. The employment rate in the region is at 91.3% . According to the Brookings Institution, the 2014 share of output by industry in Metro Manila is as follows: trade and tourism: 31.4%, business/finance: 28.6%, local/non-market: 15.6%, manufacturing: 12.5%, transportation: 4.9%, construction: 4%, utilities: 2.8%, and commodities: 0.3%.

Metro Manila will add 1.85 million square meters of office spaces between 2015 and 2017 in the central business districts in Makati, Taguig, and Quezon City as more global firms such as Google and HSBC seek to outsource business processes in the Philippines. The vacancy rate for office spaces remains low, at less 3% in the year-end of 2014. Manila remains as the least expensive capital city in the Asia-Pacific to occupy prime office space at an average rent of $22 per square meter per month.

Metro Manila makes it to the "Global Top 30" cities according to property consultancy firm Jones Lang LaSalle, citing its economic scale, vast population, large gross domestic product and BPO specialization as its competitive edge. Furthermore, the region ranks 3rd for the top business process outsourcing global destinations, next to Bangalore and Mumbai. The region's retail sector remains strong, bolstered by remittances abroad, BPOs, and its tourism sector.

Historically, the main business district of the metropolis was Binondo, where commercial trading flourished since the 15th century. By the 1960s, economic activities shifted from Binondo to Makati. It transformed Makati into one of the leading financial centers in Asia. Still, Binondo remained as a cultural and financial center because of the vast Chinese population residing and doing business in the area.

The minimum wage of Metro Manila is at ₱481 ($10.77) for non-agricultural workers and at ₱444 ($9.94) for those working in the agricultural sector, the highest minimum wage among all the 17 regions of the country. However, an increase of ₱25 was made and implemented in November 2018.

Nominal wages are what Metro Manila's current minimum wage rates are known as. The Philippine government has set these wage rates at a fixed amount.
On the other hand, the amount after inflation is what is considered the real minimum wage. For instance, the non-agricultural employees of NCR typically receive  ₱428.23 per day as opposed to  ₱537. The minimum salary for agricultural employees in Manila (including plantation and non-plantation workers) is 398.72 pesos after accounting for inflation.

Image gallery

Central business districts

Metro Manila has many central business districts (CBD), which categorizes it under the multiple nuclei model in human geography terms. The most prominent CBDs are the Makati Central Business District, Bonifacio Global City, Ortigas Center, Binondo, and Filinvest City. The region also has plenty of mixed-use developments owned and developed by private corporations such as the Ayala Corporation, Eton Properties, Megaworld Corporation and SM Prime Holdings.

The Makati Central Business District is the premier business and commercial center of the Philippines. It is the headquarters to most of the multinational corporations residing in the Philippines as well as the country's biggest commercial firms and BPO companies. The Central Business District has an office stock of 1.1 million square meters of Grade A and premium office space. It is the home to the tallest skyscrapers in the region as well as in the country.

Bonifacio Global City is the newest business district of Manila and is the premier financial and lifestyle center of the metropolis. It is located in the north-western part of Taguig. It used to be a military base known as Fort Bonifacio. The Bases and Conversion Development Authority (BCDA) privatized the property and its income from the sale was intended to be used for the modernization of the Armed Forces of the Philippines. Upon its privatization, the place was transformed into a business hub featuring numerous tourist attractions such as The Mind Museum, high-end shops, towering office skyscrapers, and luxurious lofts and condominiums. Bonifacio Global City will soon overtake the Makati Central Business District as the premier financial center of the country in the future. One of the reasons for it is that the Philippine Stock Exchange will relocate its headquarters in BGC. Also, it has more spaces and land for future developments. It is also the most active business district, generating over 50 percent of the growth in property market and has more available space for rent or lease and sale than Makati.

Ortigas Center is a central business district located in Mandaluyong and Pasig, with a small portion of it located in Quezon City. Landmarks in Ortigas include the EDSA Shrine, Shangri-La Plaza and the SM Megamall. Furthermore, The Medical City has its main campus in Ortigas Center. Important financial and national institutions headquartered in Ortigas are the Asian Development Bank, Union Bank of The Philippines and the National Economic and Development Authority. Ortigas is also the home to the headquarters of San Miguel Corporation, Jollibee Foods Corporation, Lopez Group of Companies and The Manila Electric Company.

Shopping

Global Blue ranked Manila as one of the "Best Shopping Destinations" in Asia. Metro Manila is home to some of the largest shopping malls in the world, three of which are in the top 10. SM Megamall in Mandaluyong ranks as the 3rd largest shopping mall in the world, followed by SM City North EDSA in Quezon City bagging the 4th place. Meanwhile, SM Mall of Asia in Pasay ranks as the 9th largest shopping mall in the world. Other shopping malls in Metro Manila in the list of the largest shopping malls in Metro Manila are the Ever Gotesco Commonwealth Center, Festival Supermall, Greenbelt, Market! Market!, SM Aura Premier, SM Southmall and TriNoma.

Tourism and gambling

Tourism is a vital industry of the region. Metro Manila is the main gateway to the Philippines. Trade and tourism represent 31.4% of share of NCR's output by industry according to Brookings Institution. Metro Manila welcomed 974,379 overnight visitors in 2012, making it the top overnight tourist destination of the country. Manila is visited by the majority of international tourists coming to the country registering a total of 3,139,756 arrivals in 2012.

Metro Manila has opened 4,612 hotel rooms in 2015. It is also expected to exceed the 3,500 annual addition of hotel rooms in the next two years. Gambling in Metro Manila has also become a popular tourist attraction in the region. Metro Manila is a popular gaming destination in Asia, rivaling other major gaming destinations such as Macau and Singapore. There are around 20 casinos in the metropolis, featuring luxurious casino hotels and integrated resorts. Its thriving local gambling market makes Manila attractive to casino operators. Popular gaming destinations are Resorts World Manila in Newport City in Pasay, Solaire Resort & Casino, City of Dreams Manila, Okada Manila, Westside City Resorts World, and NayonLanding in Entertainment City in Bay City, Parañaque.

Intramuros is the historic walled area within the modern City of Manila. Originally, it was considered to be Manila itself at the time when the Philippines was under the Spanish Empire colonial rule. Owing to its history and cultural value, Intramuros and Rizal Park were designated as flagship destination to become a tourism enterprise zone in the Tourism Act of 2009. Intramuros is managed by the Intramuros Administration.

The architecture of Intramuros reflects the Spanish colonial style and the American neoclassical architectural style, since the Philippines was a colony of Spain and the United States before it was granted its independence in 1946. Kalesa is a popular mode of transportation in Intramuros and nearby places such as Binondo, Ermita and the Rizal Park.

Popular tourist destinations in Intramuros include the Baluarte de San Diego, Club Intramuros Golf Course, Cuartel de Santa Lucia, Fort Santiago, Manila Cathedral, Palacio Arzobispal, Palacio de Santa Potenciana, Palacio del Gobernador, Plaza Mexico, Plaza de Roma, San Agustin Church and its newest tourist attraction, the Ayuntamiento de Manila.

Some of the country's oldest schools are founded in Intramuros, these are the University of Santo Tomas (1611), Colegio de San Juan de Letran (1620), and Ateneo de Manila University (1859). Only Colegio de San Juan de Letran (1620) remains at Intramuros; the University of Santo Tomas transferred to a new campus at Sampaloc in 1927, and Ateneo left Intramuros for Loyola Heights, Quezon City (while still retaining "de Manila" in its name) in 1952. Other prominent educational institutions include the Manila High School and the University of the City of Manila.

and contemporary life

Metro Manila is widely celebrated in popular lore, frequently the setting for mostly Filipino books, movies, and television programs. Flores de Mayo is widely celebrated throughout all the places in Metro Manila. The yearly Metro Manila Film Festival, inaugurated in 1966, is the forerunner of all Philippine film festivals.

Arts

Metro Manila is the home to the National Museum of the Philippines, the national museum of the country. It operates a chain of museums located in the grounds of Rizal Park just outside Intramuros, such as the National Museum of Fine Arts, the National Museum of Anthropology and the National Museum of Natural History. The National Museum complex occupies the place and buildings that were a part of a new capital center proposed by Daniel Burnham in 1901.

Prominent museums in Metro Manila include the Ayala Museum, Bahay Tsinoy, Casa Manila, Lopez Museum, Metropolitan Museum of Manila, The Mind Museum, Museo Pambata, Museo Valenzuela, Museum of Philippine Political History, Pasig City Museum and the Rizal Shrine. Museums established by educational institutions are the Ateneo Art Gallery, Jorge B. Vargas Museum and Filipiniana Research Center, Museum of Contemporary Art and Design, UP Museum of a History of Ideas, and the UST Museum of Arts and Sciences.

The national theater of the Philippines, known as the "Tanghalang Pambansa", is situated on a  cultural center called the Cultural Center of the Philippines Complex. The complex is located between the cities of Manila and Pasay. Aside from the CCP, other popular performing arts venue include Cuneta Astrodome, Mall of Asia Arena, Rizal Park, Quezon Memorial Circle and Smart Araneta Coliseum. Other venues used are the UPFI Film Center and UP Theater in the University of the Philippines Diliman. The famed Manila Metropolitan Theater, also known as The Met, was constructed in 1931 and was known as the "Grand Dame" among all the Art Deco theaters of Manila. Years of neglect forces its closure in 1996. The Met will be restored through a tripartite agreement with the National Commission for Culture and the Arts, the National Museum of the Philippines and the Escuela Taller.

Religion
Roman Catholicism is the predominant religion in Metro Manila. Other Christian denominations, Muslims, Anitists, animists, and atheists are the minority. Among the most important religious sites in the region are Manila Cathedral, San Sebastian Church (Manila), Tondo Church, San Agustin Church (Manila), Quiapo Church and Baclaran Church.

Sports

The National Capital Region is the home to the headquarters of the ASEAN Basketball League, Baseball Philippines, Philippine Basketball Association, Maharlika Pilipinas Basketball League, Philippine Super Liga, Shakey's V-League and the Philippines Football League. Collegiate leagues based in the National Capital Region are the Colleges and Universities Sports Association, National Athletic Association of Schools, Colleges and Universities, National Collegiate Athletic Association, National Capital Region Athletic Association, State Colleges and Universities Athletic Association, Universities and Colleges Athletic Association, University Athletic Association of the Philippines, Women's National Collegiate Athletic Association, Men's National Collegiate Athletic Association and University of Makati's Association of Local Colleges and Universities.

Two national sports complex is located in the region, the Rizal Memorial Sports Complex and the PhilSports Complex. The Wack Wack Golf and Country Club has hosted major tournaments such as the Philippine Open and the World Cup. Prominent sporting venues in Metro Manila include the Smart Araneta Coliseum, Mall of Asia Arena, Filoil Flying V Arena and the Cuneta Astrodome. The Greater Manila Area is also home to the Philippine Arena, the world's largest indoor arena. It is located in Bocaue, Bulacan and it has a maximum capacity of 55,000 people.

Metro Manila's, and in general the country's main sport is basketball. Another popular sport in the city are cue sports, and billiard halls are found in many places. Baseball, volleyball, football and swimming are also widely played sports. The region has been the champion of the Palarong Pambansa for 13 straight years. Manila Storm are a rugby league team training out of Rizal Park (Luneta Park) and playing home matches at the Southern Plains Field, Calamba, Laguna. The Metro Manila area is also home to a number of rugby union teams such as the Alabang Eagles, Makati Mavericks, Manila Nomads Sports Club and the Manila Hapons.

Human resources

Education

Since the Spanish colonial period, Manila has been the center of education. The University of Santo Tomas (1611), Colegio de San Juan de Letran (1620) and Ateneo de Manila University (1859) are some of the oldest educational institutions that was established during the colonial period. The University of the Philippines, along with seven other State Universities and Colleges (SUC), namely the Eulogio "Amang" Rodriguez Institute of Science and Technology, Marikina Polytechnic College, Philippine Normal University, Philippine State College of Aeronautics, Polytechnic University of the Philippines, Rizal Technological University and the Technological University of the Philippines, are based in Metro Manila. Manila's University Belt form the largest concentration of higher education institutes in the Philippines, making Manila the center for higher learning in the country. The country's top ranked universities, colloquially known as the "Big Four", located in Metro Manila, are widely known to be as follows, University of the Philippines System, Ateneo de Manila University, De La Salle University, and University of Santo Tomas.

Prominent secondary schools in Metro Manila include the Philippine Science High School in Diliman, Quezon City, the national science school of the Philippines and the Manila Science High School in Ermita, the forerunner of all the science schools in the country. Primary and secondary education is in the region is governed by the Department of Education-National Capital Region (DepEd-NCR). Meanwhile, the higher educational institutions are under the CHED-National Capital Region.

The region has the highest literacy rate among all the regions of the Philippines, with 99.2% in 2008. Literacy rate for males is at 99.0% while literacy rate for females is at 99.4%. For the school year of 2008–2009, Metro Manila has 511 public elementary schools and 220 public secondary schools. There are 309 tertiary (public and private) institutions as of the year-end of 2009. For the said school year, enrollment in public elementary schools is at 1,219,333, public secondary schools at 661,019 and 687,096 for tertiary (public and private) institutions.

Public health

Healthcare in Metro Manila is mostly provided by private corporations. 72% of region's hospitals are privately owned. , the region has 179 hospitals. Quezon City has the most hospitals while Valenzuela and Pateros do not have any. In 2008, government health workers in NCR comprises 590 doctors, 498 dentists, 4,576 nurses, and 17,437 midwives. Furthermore, Metro Manila has 27,779 beds with a ratio of 2.47 per 1,000 population . The region has the lowest malnutrition rate among all the regions in the country.

The headquarters of the World Health Organization Regional Office for the Western Pacific, and the World Health Organization Country Office for the Philippines are in the region. The main office of the Department of Health, the national health department, is also in the region.

Metro Manila is designated by the Department of Health as the pioneer of medical tourism, expecting it to generate $1 billion in revenue annually. However, lack of progressive health system, inadequate infrastructure and the unstable political environment are seen as hindrances for its growth. Under the Philippine Medical Tourism Program, there are 16 participating hospitals (private and public) in Metro Manila with a total number of 6,748 beds . Five out of six hospitals in the country accredited by the Joint Commission International are in the region, these are the Asian Hospital and Medical Center, Makati Medical Center, St. Luke's Medical Center – Global City, St. Luke's Medical Center – Quezon City and The Medical City.

East Avenue in Quezon City is the location of prominent national health centers: the Lung Center of the Philippines, National Kidney and Transplant Institute, and the Philippine Heart Center. Other national special hospital in Metro Manila include the Philippine Orthopedic Center in Quezon City, and the National Center for Mental Health in Mandaluyong. The Philippine General Hospital, the country's premier state-owned tertiary hospital is located at the City of Manila. The St. Luke's Medical Center which operates in Quezon City and Taguig, is a private tertiary referral hospital cited as one of the best hospitals in the world.

Public safety

The Philippine National Police is responsible for law enforcement in the country. Its headquarters is located at Camp Crame along Bonny Serrano Avenue, Quezon City. The National Capital Region Police Office (NCRPO) is the regional branch of PNP that operates in the region. Its headquarters is located at Camp Bagong Diwa in Bicutan, Taguig. Under the supervision of NCRPO, Metro Manila is divided into five police districts. The five police districts are the Northern Police District, Eastern Police District, Southern Police District and Quezon City Police District.

Metro Manila has the highest rate of crime in the country in 2014, with 59,448 crimes reported (excluding crimes reported in barangay level) with 25,353 of these crimes committed against persons. Following criticisms of high crime rate in Metro Manila, the Philippine National Police launched a relentless anti-crime drive that resulted in the decrease of crimes in the metropolis. As of March 2015 Metro Manila's crime rate is down by 50%. From an average of 919 crimes reported weekly, it has gone down to 412. Recorded robberies and theft also decreased by 63 in just a month. All the 159 police community precincts of Metro Manila will be using the electronic blotter system in recording crimes starting June 2015.

The Bureau of Fire Protection National Capital Region provides fire protection and technical rescue as well as emergency medical services to the metropolis. It is broadly organized into five firefighting districts: Manila, Quezon City, District II, District III and District IV.

The headquarters of the Armed Forces of the Philippines is located at Camp Aguinaldo, along with the Department of National Defense, in Murphy, Quezon City. Aside from Camp Aguinaldo, other military bases situated in the region are Camp Atienza and Fort Bonifacio. The Philippine Army has their headquarters at Fort Bonifacio, Taguig. The Villamor Air Base in Ninoy Aquino International Airport is the home to the headquarters of the Philippine Air Force while the headquarters of the Philippine Navy is located at Roxas Boulevard, Malate, Manila.

The Philippine Coast Guard is headquartered at Port Area (Manila South Harbor), City of Manila. Its Coast Guard NCR District also has its headquarters in the city and has another Coast Guard Station in Pasig. It also has a base in Taguig and maintains several detachments located in Navotas, Parañaque, Tangos, Vitas, Manila North Harbor, Manila South Harbor and the Cultural Center of the Philippines.

In 2012, the AFP Joint Task Force-National Capital Region was launched to ensure peace and stability in Metro Manila, bearing the same function of the deactivated National Capital Regional Command, although it operates on a much smaller size than its predecessor.

Infrastructure

Transportation

According to the Land Transportation Franchising and Regulatory Board, public ridership in Metro Manila composes of the following: 46% of the people go around by jeepneys, 32% by private vehicle, 14% by bus, and 8% use the railway system. Transportation development in Metro Manila follows the Metro Manila Dream Plan, which consists of building short-term to long-term infrastructure lasting up to 2030 and addressing its issues on traffic, land use and environment.

Roads and highways

The roads of Metro Manila is built around the City of Manila. Roads are classified as local, national or subdivision roads. There are ten radial roads branching out from the city. Also there are five circumferential roads forming a series of concentric semi-circular arcs around Manila. The circumferential and radial roads are systems of interconnected roads, bridges and highways. A problem with the circumferential roads are the missing road links. These are the roads that are not yet constructed to give way for development due to Metro Manila's rapid urbanization. The metropolis is resolving this problem through the completion of missing road links or through the construction of connector roads.

The radial and circumferential road system are being supplanted by a new numbered highway system implemented by the Department of Public Works and Highways, and new signage are being placed with its implementation. Expressways are being assigned numbers with the E prefix. National roads are assigned 1 to 3 digit numbers, except for those classified as tertiary national roads.

An important circumferential road is the Circumferential Road 4, with the Epifanio de los Santos Avenue as its major component. It traverses the cities of Pasay, Makati, Mandaluyong, Quezon City and Caloocan. Line 3 follows the alignment of EDSA, from Taft Avenue in Pasay up to TriNoma, terminating before it reaches Caloocan. Circumferential Road 5 serves the people near the regional limits of Metro Manila and also serves as an alternate route for Circumferential Road 4.

Prominent radial roads include the Radial Road 1, composed of Roxas Boulevard and the Manila–Cavite Expressway (Coastal Road) that connects Metro Manila to Cavite, Radial Road 3 or the South Luzon Expressway that connects Metro Manila to Laguna, Radial Road 6, composed of Aurora Boulevard and Marcos Highway that runs up to Rizal and Radial Road 8 or the North Luzon Expressway that serves as the gateway to the north.

The Skyway serves as the region's main expressway, directly connecting the North Luzon Expressway and the South Luzon Expressway. It also enables access to Ninoy Aquino International Airport via the NAIA Expressway (NAIAX). Other expressways such as the Manila–Cavite Expressway and Muntinlupa–Cavite Expressway also connect Metro Manila to its surrounding areas.

The development of roads, highways and expressways are based on the Metro Manila Dream Plan. Ongoing projects in the dream plan include the rehabilitation of EDSA, Skyway Stage 3 and the construction of the missing road links for the circumferential roads (e.g. Taft Avenue Flyover, Metro Manila Interchange Project Phase IV).

Railway systems

Rail transportation in the Greater Manila Area is a major part of the transportation system in Metro Manila and its surrounding areas. It consists of the Manila Light Rail Transit System, Manila Metro Rail Transit System, and the PNR Metro Commuter Line. The network makes up the majority of active railways in the country and bear the brunt of providing the metropolis with rail as a faster alternative mode of transport other than buses and jeepneys. However, these systems are currently insufficient for the rapidly expanding metropolis; to address this, new lines and line extensions are under construction, which will extend the system far out into neighboring regions.

Several new railway projects are being undertaken by the national government and the private sector. These include the North–South Commuter Railway, the Metro Manila Subway, and MRT Line 7, all of which are under construction. Line extensions such as the LRT Line 1 South extension and the LRT Line 2 West extension are in the pipeline. Other line extensions and railway lines are in the planning stage.

Air
Ninoy Aquino International Airport (NAIA) is the only airport and the premier gateway in Metro Manila. It is the busiest airport in the Philippines. NAIA has four terminals: Terminal 1, Terminal 2 (which is exclusively used by Philippine Airlines), Terminal 3 (the newest and largest airport terminal in NAIA) and Terminal 4 (also known as the Manila Domestic Passenger Terminal).

Buses

Bus franchises in the region are regulated by the Land Transportation Franchising and Regulatory Board. The Premium Point-to-Point Bus Service is the express bus system that runs from its dispatch terminal in Fairview up to the central business districts along EDSA. It aims to cut travel time substantially and provide a faster, safer and more convenient bus service to commuters, who are usually caught at the heavy traffic across the metropolis. A second express bus link from SM North EDSA, Trinoma and SM Megamall to Makati opened in December 2015, and by January 2016 was the line on which, for the first time in nearly three decades, a double-decker bus traveled on EDSA, to the delight of motorists, followed by a third link, this time from Robinsons Galleria to the Ayala Center complex in February 2016 and a fourth in March linking the Ayala Center to the Alabang Town Center in Muntinlupa via the Metro Manila Skyway (and later to Ayala Malls South Park). As of the present express buses also link the Market Market mall and Circuit Makati to both the Nuvali residential township and the Pacita Village complex in San Pedro, both in Laguna, in services launched in 2014 and 2017, respectively (plus additional services to the UP Town Mall in Quezon City and SM Masinag in Antipolo, Rizal), while intercity express buses have been in operation since 2015 to alleviate traffic on EDSA. In 2018, additional services from the Makati CBD and from San Lorenzo Place up to Cavite debuted.

Metro Manila will have its bus rapid transit system operational by 2018. The  proposed BRT system will traverse Commonwealth Avenue up to the Manila City Hall. The planned BRT system costs ₱4.9 billion ($109.5 million) and will have a fleet of 300 buses and 32 stations.

Ferry

The Pasig River Ferry Service run by the Metropolitan Manila Development Authority is the principal ferry shuttle system of Metro Manila. It traverses the Pasig River from Barangay Pinagbuhatan in Pasig to Plaza Mexico in Intramuros. Although it was referred to as a ferry, it is more akin to a water bus. It has 17 stations, but only 14 are operational. Another ferry route called the Manila-Bataan Ferry was launched on May 10, 2017, and traverses Manila Bay from the Bay Terminal at CCP Complex in Manila to Orion, Bataan. A new ferry route known as the Cavite-Manila Ferry Service that runs between Noveleta, Cavite and Intramuros was launched in January 2018.

Electricity and water

Meralco is the sole electric distributor of Metro Manila. It generates its power from the National Power Corporation and other independent power producers in Luzon. The Metropolitan Waterworks and Sewerage System (MWSS) was responsible for the supply and delivery of potable water and the sewerage system in Metro Manila. It was privatized in 1997 and the region and its immediate surrounding areas were split into the east and west concession. The winning corporations provide the same function of MWSS.

The Maynilad Water Services took over the west zone, which is composed of Manila (excluding the southeastern part of the city), Caloocan, Las Piñas, Malabon, Muntinlupa, Navotas, Parañaque, Pasay and Valenzuela. It also operates in some parts of Makati and Quezon City. Manila Water operates on the east zone, comprising the cities of Mandaluyong, Marikina, Pasig, Pateros, San Juan and Taguig. It also operates in large areas of Makati and Quezon City and the southeastern part of Manila, which was excluded from the west zone.

For garbage hauling, the region spent ₱4.221 billion ($93.855 million) in 2013. Quezon City spent the most at ₱994.59 million ($22.115 million) while Pateros, the region's only municipality, spent the least money on garbage at ₱9.478 million ($210,747).

See also
Outline of Metro Manila
List of metropolitan areas in Asia
Greater Manila Area
Imperial Manila
Mega Manila

References

External links

Metro Manila Development Authority – Official website

 
1975 establishments in the Philippines
Philippines
Philippines, Metro Manila
Luzon
Manila
Regions of the Philippines
States and territories established in 1975
Establishments by Philippine presidential decree